The 2007 Trail World Championships was the 1st edition of the global trail running competition, Trail World Championships, organised by the International Association of Ultrarunners (IAU) and was held in Huntsville, Texas (United States), the 8 December 2007.

Results

Men

Women

References

External links
 Official web site of IAU (governing body for ultra running)
 Official web site of ITRA (governing body for trail running)

IAU Trail World Championships
Trial World Championships
Huntsville, Texas
Trial World Championships
Running in the United States